Huddersfield Town's 1965–66 campaign was a fairly successful season for the Town. For a large amount of the season, Town were on the verge on promotion to Division 1. Town also managed to reach the 5th round of the FA Cup, before losing to Sheffield Wednesday. Town finished in 4th place, but a win in the final game against Coventry City, might have given the team promotion, but a 2–0 defeat left the door open for Southampton.

Squad at the start of the season

Review
Tom Johnston began his first full season in charge of Huddersfield Town in glorious mood. They won their first 3 games, which included a 6–0 win over Middlesbrough, where both Allan Gilliver and Les Massie scored hat-tricks. Gilliver actually scored 7 goals in his first 4 league games, which would lead him to a transfer to Blackburn Rovers at the end of the season. By Christmas, Town were at the summit of the 2nd Division, but a little drop in form saw them slowly go down the table.

A nice run in the FA Cup saw Town reach the 5th round, before they narrowly lost to Sheffield Wednesday. Town only won 2 of their last 10 matches, which saw them miss out on promotion by just 3 points from Southampton. This would be the closest that Town would get to Division 1 until their promotion in the 1969–70 season.

Squad at the end of the season

Results

Division Two

FA Cup

Football League Cup

Appearances and goals

1965-66
English football clubs 1965–66 season